G2/mitotic-specific cyclin-B2 is a protein that in humans is encoded by the CCNB2 gene.

Function 

Cyclin B2 is a member of the cyclin family, specifically the B-type cyclins. The B-type cyclins, B1 and B2, associate with p34cdc2 and are essential components of the cell cycle regulatory machinery. B1 and B2 differ in their subcellular localization. Cyclin B1 co-localizes with microtubules, whereas cyclin B2 is primarily associated with the Golgi region. Cyclin B2 also binds to transforming growth factor beta RII and thus cyclin B2/cdc2 may play a key role in transforming growth factor beta-mediated cell cycle control.

Interactions 

Cyclin B2 has been shown to interact with TGF beta receptor 2.

See also 
 Cyclin B

References

Further reading 

 
 
 
 
 
 
 
 
 
 
 
 
 
 
 
 
 
 
 

Cell cycle regulators